Vyazemsky Lane is a side street in Petrogradsky District of Saint Petersburg, Russia. It connects Professora Popova Street with Sand Embankment.

Naming
In the 19th century this street was named Lavalev Street, then Zadny Lane, Glukhoy Lane, and finally Vyazemsky Lane, after the landowners, the Vyazemskys family. It was renamed Belgorodskaya Street on December 15, 1952, but a year later, on January 4, 1954, the original name was restored.

Street
The street is approximately 500 meters long. Although it is named as side street, it is wider (30 m) than main avenues of Petrogradsky District: Kamennoostrovsky Prospekt and Bolshoy Avenue (both approximately 20 meters).

There are several apartment buildings, the 32nd polyclinic (house number 3), the dormitory of Saint Petersburg State University of Information Technologies, Mechanics and Optics (number 5-7), and Vyazemsky Garden.

References

Streets in Saint Petersburg